Granuloma faciale  is an uncommon benign chronic skin disease of unknown origin characterized by single or multiple cutaneous nodules, usually occurring over the face. Occasionally, extrafacial involvement is noted, most often on sun-exposed areas.

Diagnosis 
Skin biopsy for histopathology: 
Focal LCV, diffuse dermal neutrophilia with leukocytoclasia, tissue eosinophilia & perivascular fibrosis.

Differential diagnosis 
The disease mimics many other dermatoses and can be confused with conditions, such as sarcoidosis, discoid lupus erythematosus, mycosis fungoides, and fixed drug eruption.

Treatment
Topical corticosteroid,
Intralesional corticosteroid,
Dapsone,
Colchicine,
Antimalarial,
Pulse dye laser,
Carbon dioxide laser.

History 
GF was first described in 1945 by John Edwin Mackonochie Wigley (1892–1962).

See also 
 Cutaneous small-vessel vasculitis
 List of cutaneous conditions

References

External links 

Eosinophilic cutaneous conditions